Raymond Richard Evans (September 22, 1922April 24, 1999) was an American football halfback. He was an All-American in football and a two time All-American in basketball at the University of Kansas and is considered possibly the greatest overall athlete to ever attend KU. In addition to his multi-sport prowess in college, Evans would go on to play professional football and basketball, and was even offered a contract to play baseball for the New York Yankees.

College career

Football
Ecans played both halfback on offense and defensive back on defense at KU. During his 1947 All-American season, Evans led the Jayhawks to a Big Six Conference championship and an appearance in the Orange Bowl. He also holds the distinction as the only NCAA football player ever to lead the nation in passing on offense and interceptions on defense in the same season.  In fact, Evans is still the Jayhawks single-season (10) and career (17) leader in interceptions.

Basketball
Evans was also a standout guard on the basketball team. He was an All-American member of the 1943 conference championship team (which also featured Charles B. Black and Otto Schnellbacher).

Legacy
Evans is the only athlete at KU to have both his basketball jersey (15) and football jersey (42) retired. His college athletic career was interrupted by three years of service with the United States Army Air Forces during World War II. He was elected to the College Football Hall of Fame in 1964.

Professional career
Evans was drafted by the New York Knicks in the 1947 BAA Draft but went on to play in the National Football League for the Pittsburgh Steelers (1948).

Business career
Evans was the president of the Traders National Bank of Kansas City and was part of a group that owned the Kansas City Kings of the National Basketball Association. Evans died in his home on April 24, 1999 from natural causes.

References

1922 births
1999 deaths
All-American college men's basketball players
American bank presidents
American football halfbacks
American men's basketball players
Businesspeople from Kansas City, Missouri
College Football Hall of Fame inductees
Sportspeople from Kansas City, Kansas
Guards (basketball)
Kansas City Kings owners
Kansas Jayhawks football players
Kansas Jayhawks men's basketball players
New York Knicks draft picks
Pittsburgh Steelers players
Second Air Force Superbombers football players
United States Army Air Forces personnel of World War II
United States Army Air Forces soldiers